Josep Colom (born January 11, 1947) is a Spanish classical pianist.

Biography and career 
Colom was born in Barcelona, Spain. He began piano lessons in Barcelona with his aunt Rosa Colom, and later moved to Paris to study at the École Normale de Musique. His many awards include First Prize at the first ever Santander National Piano Competition (1972) and subsequently, the Paloma O'Shea Santander International Piano Competition (1978) and First Prize at the Jaén and Épinal International Competitions. Since his debut at the Théâtre des Champs Elysées in Paris in 1979, he has regularly toured the five continents giving recitals and concerts with orchestras and performing chamber music with a wide variety of ensembles and artists.

He made his first recordings in 1982 with the complete Sonatas of Manuel Blasco de Nebra (Etnos), for which he was awarded the Spanish Ministry of Culture Prize. In 1989 he recorded the complete works of Manuel de Falla (Circe), an album that Fanfare magazine hailed as the best version of Falla's works. He has also recorded the complete works of Frederic Mompou, the complete concertos and variations of Johannes Brahms, as well as works by Fauré, Debussy, Ravel and Brahms in collaboration with the pianist Carmen Deleito.

Mr Colom has served as jury of many important piano competitions, including the Paloma O'Shea International Piano Competition and the International Chopin Piano Competition in Warsaw. In 1998 the Spanish Ministry of Culture awarded him the Premio Nacional de Música. Since 2010 he regularly teaches in Valencia at the Musikeon Postgraduate Programs, and gives masterclass in Spain (Aula de Música de la Universidad de Alcalá de Henares), Switzerland (Cours International de Blonay) and France (École Normale de Musique de Paris), among others.

External links
 Colom's Bio at the Musikeon website
 Colom’s Bio at the Festival Ibérico de Música

References

1947 births
Living people
Spanish classical pianists
Male classical pianists
Catalan pianists
Prize-winners of the Paloma O'Shea International Piano Competition
21st-century classical pianists
21st-century male musicians
Spanish male musicians